Peter Theo Curtis (also known as Theo Padnos; born 1968) is an American journalist who was released by the al-Nusra Front in August 2014, after being held hostage for almost two years. He was the cellmate of American war photographer Matt Schrier, who escaped after seven months of captivity.

Early life and career
Peter Theophilus Eaton Padnos was born in Atlanta, Georgia, to Michael Padnos, a writer now living in Paris (then he worked as a lawyer), and Nancy Curtis. He received his bachelor's degree from Middlebury College in Vermont and his doctorate in comparative literature from the University of Massachusetts at Amherst. He is fluent in French, Arabic, German, and Russian.

He moved to Vermont and taught poetry to prisoners of a local jail. His first book, My Life Had Stood a Loaded Gun, was written about this experience. In this book he firstly shows his interest in writing about disaffected youth. He then relocated to Yemen, where he changed his legal name to Peter Theo Curtis, under which he continued writing.

Padnos began his study of Islam in Yemen at Dar al-Hadith, before moving to Damascus, Syria, to enroll in an Islamic religious school. His second book, Undercover Muslim, where he highlights the topic of Islamic extremism, was published in the UK.  After its publication, the changing of his name (to Peter Theo Curtis) made travel in the Middle East easier. Since he had declared allegiance to Islam in public, the book could be interpreted as apostasy. In 2012, he became a freelance journalist. He created articles about the Middle East for magazines such as the New Republic, The Huffington Post and the London Review of Books.

He then moved to Antakya, Turkey, near the Syrian border. Although Curtis originally claimed in his NY Times article that he went to Syria to "stop into villages and interview people, telling the story of a nation with many identities, dissatisfied with them all, in trouble, wanting help,"  he later completely changed his story in his documentary, claiming he was there to "follow some refugees back into Syria and write about the adverse conditions in the camps."  However, in his former cellmate's book, "The Dawn Prayer," Matthew Schrier claims Curtis told him he was in Syria to write a story about abducted American journalist Austin Tice, and provided documentation proving so in the form of an email Curtis wrote to Tice's editor shortly before he was kidnapped asking him to "commission" the article.

Abduction and imprisonment
Curtis was held in a series of prisons run by Syrian rebel groups with ties to Al Qaeda. His family was asked to pay a ransom of an amount of money between $3 million and $25 million. According to his account of his captivity published in The New York Times Magazine on November 2, 2014, he was held by al-Nusra Front and later by Abu Mariya al-Qahtani, who also released him.

Curtis considers himself "most responsible" for his kidnapping, believing he was reckless in crossing into Syria with smugglers he did not know and who held him captive. Commenting on the torture and mistreatment he endured at first, he says, It seemed to me that I had been walking calmly through an olive grove with Syrian friends, that a rent in the earth had opened, that I had fallen into the darkness and woken in a netherworld, the kind found in myths or nightmares.

Curtis was imprisoned with another American, the New York photographer Matthew Schrier. Both were tortured by Al Qaeda and Schrier, of Russian Jewish heritage, strategically converted to Islam as a survival tactic while Curtis remained a Christian. Toward the end of July 2013, Curtis and Schrier devised a way to crawl out of a small window in the cell. The men have given competing accounts of the escape attempt. Schrier ultimately successfully escaped while Curtis became stuck in a window.

Curtis said that he escaped twice, each time seeking refuge with the Free Syrian Army, and that both times they delivered him back to the Al Nusra Front.

Release
Relatives were not told the terms of Curtis's release, which came one week after James Foley's beheading by the Islamic State.
A team led by editor David G. Bradley and the Padnos family contacted Ghanem Khalifa al-Kubaisi, head of Qatar State Security, who mediated for Curtis's release and according to what it told the Padnos family it was "on a humanitarian basis without the payment of money". The kidnappers had demanded ransom reaching 22 million euros. Curtis states that he was released to the UN mission in the Golan Heights.

A documentary about Curtis' time in captivity was released in 2016 titled Theo Who Lived.

In 2018 Curtis was featured on the National Geographic television show Locked Up Abroad in the episode 'Escape from Al Qaeda'.

In 2021 he released a book, Blindfold: A Memoir of Capture, Torture, and Enlightenment, detailing his captivity.

See also

 2014 American Intervention in Syria
 Foreign hostages in Iraq
 Hostage Working Group
 Kenneth Bigley
 Nick Berg
 Daniel Pearl
 Steven Sotloff

References

External links

University of Massachusetts Amherst alumni
Middlebury College alumni
American people taken hostage
Foreign hostages in Syria
American male journalists
Writers from Atlanta
1968 births
Living people